Ezernieki Parish is an administrative territorial entity of Krāslava Municipality in the Latgale region of Latvia.

Towns, villages and settlements of Ezernieki Parish

References 

Parishes of Latvia
Krāslava Municipality
Latgale